Khwaja Yunus Ali University is a private university in Bangladesh. It is situated in Enayetpur, Sirajganj, Rajshahi. It was founded in 2012 under the Private University Act, and named after Sufi saint Khwaja Yunus Ali (also known as Khwaja Enayetpuri).

Undergraduate programs

Faculty of Science & Engineering 
B.Sc. in Textile Engineering (TE)
B.Sc. in Computer Science and Engineering (CSE)
B.Sc. in Electrical and Electronics Engineering (EEE)
B.Sc. in Electronic and Telecommunication Engineering (ETE)

Faculty of Business Studies 
Bachelor of Management Information Systems (MIS)
Bachelor of Business Administration (BBA)

Faculty of Bio-medical Science 
B.Sc. in Biochemistry and Biotechnology (BCBT)
B.Sc. in Microbiology (MB)
Bachelor of Pharmacy (Hons)

Faculty of Human Science 
Bachelor of Library & Information Science (LIS)
B.A (Hon's) in English
B.A (Hon's) in Islamic Studies

Faculty of Law 
Bachelor of Law (LLB)

Graduate programs

Faculty of Science & Engineering
M.Sc. in Mechatronics and Micro-mechatronics Engineering (M.MME)
M.S. in Medical Physics (M.MP)

Faculty of Business Studies
Masters of Management Information Systems (Proposed)
Master of Business Administration (MBA)
Executive Masters of Business Administration (EMBA)

Faculty of Human Science
Master of Arts in English (ELT)
Master of Arts in Islamic Studies (M.IS)
Master of Arts Islamic Studies (Preliminary)
Master of Library & Information Science (M.LIS)
Postgraduate Diploma in Library & Information Science

Faculty of Law
Master of Law (LLM)

Academic session
"KYAU" follows the bi-Semester. The schedule of an academic year will be as follows:

 Fall   : September  -  February
 Summer : March - August

University clubs
English Language Club
Engineering Club
Medical Club
Sports Club
Debate Club
Social and Cultural Club
Blood Donation Club

References

Universities and colleges in Sirajganj District
2012 establishments in Bangladesh
Educational institutions established in 2012